Hysham is a town in and the county seat of Treasure County, Montana, United States. The population was 276 at the 2020 census.

Geography
Hysham is located at  (46.290535, -107.229929).

Hysham is bordered to the north by the Yellowstone River. The surrounding area is composed of rolling hills and farmland.

History
When the Montana Territory became the state of Montana in 1889 the future site of Hysham was just a blank spot in the rolling prairie along the Yellowstone River.  At that time, the area was within sprawling Custer County, which covered much of eastern Montana, and also included the eastern part of the Crow Indian Reservation.  The area was opened up to homesteading in 1906 after the federal government moved the Crow Indian Reservation boundary further west to its present location.  This made possible the development of farms and ranches throughout the area and at the same time allowed the settlement of small towns like Hysham (Cheney 1984).

The location and founding of the town of Hysham is intertwined with its ranching and railroad history.  A large cattle ranch, the Flying E, ran thousands of heads of cattle in the region.  Charlie J. Hysham had moved from the town of Red Oak, Iowa, to manage the ranch.  In order to facilitate the delivery of the large amounts of supplies the Flying E ranch required, the Northern Pacific Railroad built a siding to unload goods and materials that Hysham had ordered from Billings and Forsyth.  In 1907, the siding became the nucleus for the town of Hysham. (Cheney 1984; Kimball 1976).

James O. Lockard built the first building on the future site of Hysham shortly after the area was open to homesteading.  Later, his homestead south of the railroad tracks would become the "Lockard Addition" in Hysham.  The general store was located north of the railroad tracks and also served as Hysham's first post office with Lockard appointed the first postmaster.  Hysham slowly grew by a general process typical throughout the frontier where an initial commercial or transportation need would establish the site, which would then grow as settlers homesteaded nearby.  This would, in turn, resulted in the need for other commercial enterprises followed by schools, churches, banks, government and other civic institutions (Cheney 1984; Kimball 1976; Sanborn 1920).

In 1906 there were two stores, a lumber yard and a blacksmith shop. The first school at the growing community was built in 1908. Ada Channel, who had a homestead near the railroad siding, became the school's first teacher. She was also a key figure in the formation of Hysham. This same year, she worked to locate a town site with the help of James Lockard and F. L. Baker. E. C. Sampson completed the process with a survey, which established the town's streets. Two other additions were added later. Even though Charlie Hysham had moved away from the area by this time, the new town was named Hysham in his honor. The town was officially incorporated in 1916 (Sanborn 1920: Kimball 1976; Cheney 1984).

As more families were attracted to the area, more businesses were established.  Town mayor, James Lyndes, the started a real estate business with C. M. Patterson and opened a law office.  He served as the first County Attorney and Hysham's first Mayor.  Lyndes' wife Mary Alice served as chairman of the school board and for the first few years, the high school was held above the Lyndes and Patterson store.  Also among the first town's residents were F. L. and Christiania Baker.  Baker owned a threshing machine and did custom threshing (Kimball 1976).

Another phase of the community development process usually occurred after the initial settlers became established and then encouraged friends and relatives to move to the area.  Such was the case with the Lyndes family.  After James Lyndes set up his law and real estate business, four of his brothers: Bert, Wallace, Elmer and C. W. "Kid" and their families, became some of the earliest Hysham residents (Kimball 1976).

With the growth of commercial and agricultural businesses came the need for banks to finance the economic growth.  The first bank in Hysham was the First National Bank, established in 1910, with J. W. Wagner serving as president.  The bank continued to serve the community for more than half a century.  Five years later, C. C. Jordan gambled on the boom caused by World War I and opened the Treasure State Bank.  However, this bank was not as fortunate as its predecessor and ran into hard times with the post-war recession and a brutal winter in 1919, which severely damaged many of the area's cattle ranches.  It was forced to close in 1922, which further hurt many local ranchers who had invested heavily in the bank (Kimball 1976).

For the most part, however, the 1910s were a period of prosperity.  Hysham boasted of concrete sidewalks with modern infrastructure including electric lights, telephone, water, and sewer.  New businesses included an International Harvester dealership, a drug store, a hotel, the Pin-Con confections and ice cream parlor, a hardware business, a grocery store, the Rosebud Flour mill, a grain elevator, a butcher shop, a bakery, the Hysham Echo newspaper, a barber shop and pool hall as well as other enterprises.  Besides new businesses, the decade saw the establishment of many social institutions such as the Hysham Community Church, the Presbyterian Church, the Hysham School, the Hysham Women's Club and the Buffington Hall, which was used for dances, basketball games, community meetings and other programs until it burned down in 1939 (Kimball 1976; Cheney 1984).

Another development, which occurred during the 1910s, was the improvement of the area's road system.  In 1914, the Montana State Highway Commission placed the "Yellowstone Trail" county road between Custer and Hysham on the Federal-Aid highway system.  The road eventually followed a county road that ran just south of the Yellowstone River, crossing it over the Myers Bridge, which was a multi-span steel through truss span built in 1907.  Other roads were either constructed or improved during this period (Axline 1991).

Symbolic of this perseverance in the face of adversity, was the construction of the Yucca Theatre in 1931 by local businessman and politician, David M. Manning and his brother Jim Manning, just when the nationwide depression was at its nadir.  This striking building is in the Mission style, which may have been the result of Manning's time spent in the Southwest where he would have seen similar buildings.  However, it was unique to the Hysham area and undoubtedly was a source of civic pride to the community and does to this day show movies every Sunday. (U.S. Department of Interior 1993).

Manning went on to become the owner or part owner of five different businesses; he helped build the city swimming pool and city water system; he built two dams in the Hysham area and improved the irrigation system.  In addition to his many projects and businesses in Hysham, he also served in the Montana legislature where he was instrumental in promoting rural electrification and highway construction (U.S. Department of Interior 1993).  After 52 continuous years of service (1933–1985), he retired as Dean of the Montana Senate and senior state legislator in the nation (Andrea Merrill-Maker, Montana Almanac, p. 159).

Climate

According to the Köppen Climate Classification system, Hysham has a hot-summer humid continental climate, abbreviated "Dfa" on climate maps.

Demographics

2010 census
As of the census of 2010, there were 312 people, 145 households, and 94 families residing in the town. The racial makeup of the town was 92.6% White, 1.9% Native American, 1.0% Asian, and 4.5% from two or more races. Hispanic or Latino of any race were 2.6% of the population.

There were 145 households, of which 20.7% had children under the age of 18 living with them, 55.9% were married couples living together, 3.4% had a female householder with no husband present, 5.5% had a male householder with no wife present, and 35.2% were non-families. 33.1% of all households were made up of individuals, and 15.9% had someone living alone who was 65 years of age or older. The average household size was 2.15 and the average family size was 2.69.

The median age in the town was 52.8 years. 18.9% of residents were under the age of 18; 4.5% were between the ages of 18 and 24; 14.4% were from 25 to 44; 34% were from 45 to 64; and 28.2% were 65 years of age or older. The gender makeup of the town was 50.3% male and 49.7% female.

2000 census
As of the census of 2000, there were 330 people, 150 households, and 91 families residing in the town. The population density was 1,574.8 people per square mile (606.7/km2). There were 172 housing units at an average density of 820.8 per square mile (316.2/km2). The racial makeup of the town was 94.55% White, 3.94% Native American, 0.30% Asian, and 1.21% from two or more races. Hispanic or Latino of any race were 0.91% of the population.

There were 150 households, out of which 24.0% had children under the age of 18 living with them, 52.0% were married couples living together, 5.3% had a female householder with no husband present, and 38.7% were non-families. 37.3% of all households were made up of individuals, and 21.3% had someone living alone who was 65 years of age or older. The average household size was 2.20 and the average family size was 2.83.

In the town, the population was spread out, with 25.5% under the age of 18, 4.5% from 18 to 24, 18.2% from 25 to 44, 31.2% from 45 to 64, and 20.6% who were 65 years of age or older. The median age was 46 years. For every 100 females there were 96.4 males. For every 100 females age 18 and over, there were 90.7 males.

The median income for a household in the town was $30,179, and the median income for a family was $39,063. Males had a median income of $31,250 versus $18,750 for females. The per capita income for the town was $15,743. About 5.8% of families and 13.4% of the population were below the poverty line, including 20.2% of those under age 18 and 9.6% of those age 65 or over.

Education
Hysham Public Schools educates students from kindergarten through 12th grade. Hysham High School's team name is the Rebels.

Notable people
 Cass Bauer-Bilodeau, former collegiate and professional women's basketball player, was born in Hysham.
 David Manning, longest-serving state legislator in U.S. history
 Lee Nye, photographer, was born in Hysham.

References

Bibliography
 Axline, Jon, 1991. "Montana Cultural Resource Inventory Form, Buckingham Coulee Bridge (24TE44)."  Montana State Historic Preservation Office, Helena, Montana.
 Carrington, Ruth (editor) and Edna Mackley, 1976. Tales of Treasure County: Historical Essays by Residents of Treasure County, Montana.  Treasure County Bicentennial Commission.
 Cheney, Roberta Carkeek, 1975. Names on the Face of Montana, Mountain Press, Missoula, Montana.
 Kimball, Ray, 1976. "Hysham," (In Carrington and Mackley, Tales of Treasure County).  Treasure County Bicentennial Commission).
 Malone, Michael P. and Richard W. Etulain, 1989. The American West: A Twentieth-Century History.  University of Nebraska Press, Lincoln, Nebraska.
 Malone, Michael P., Richard B. Roeder and William L. Lang, 1991. Montana, A History of Two Centuries.  University of Washington Press, Seattle and London.
 Montana State Historic Preservation Office, 1999. "Montana Historical and Architectural Inventory Form, Hysham Post Office (24TE107)."  Montana State Historic Preservation Office, Helena, Montana.
 Mulloy, William T., 1958. "A Preliminary Historical Outline for the Northwestern Plains." University of Wyoming Publications in Science 22 (1).  Laramie.
 Sanborn Map Company, 1920. "Hysham Fire Insurance Map (corrected in 1927 and 1937)."  New York City.
 Treasure County Assessor. Treasure County Assessor Records, Hysham, Montana.
 United States Department of the Interior, 1993. "National Register of Historic Places Registration Form for the Yucca Theatre (24TE54)."  U.S. Department of the Interior, National Park Service, Interagency Resources Division, National Register of Historic Places.

External links
 Hysham Chamber of Commerce

Towns in Treasure County, Montana
County seats in Montana